Les Cowan (December 24, 1925 – March 9, 1979) was an American football defensive tackle and defensive end. He played for the Chicago Bears in 1951.

References

1925 births
1979 deaths
American football defensive ends
American football defensive tackles
McMurry War Hawks football players
Chicago Bears players